The Uganda Ministry of Public Service is a Cabinet level government ministry. The ministry is mandated to "develop, manage and administer human resource policies, management systems, procedures and structure for the public service" in Uganda.

The ministry is headed by a Cabinet minister, Wilson Muruli Mukasa.

Location
The headquarters of the ministry are located at 12 Nakasero Hill Road in the neighborhood of Wandegeya in Kampala, the capital city of Uganda. The coordinates of the headquarters of the ministry are 0°19'53.0"N, 32°34'34.0"E (Latitude:0.331389; Longitude:32.576111).

Overview
The ministry is organised under three directorates:

 Directorate of Research and Development
 Monitoring and Evaluation Department
 Information, Education and Communication Department
 Directorate of Efficiency and Quality Assurance
 Department of Public Service Inspection
 Management Services Department
 Department for Records and Information Technology
 Directorate of Human Resource Management 
 Department of Human Resource Management
 Department of Compensation
 Department of Human Resource Development

Administrative structure
The cabinet minister is assisted by State Minister for Public Service David Karubanga. The chief accounting officer for the ministry is Permanent Secretary Catherine Bitarakwate Musingwiire.

List of ministers
 Wilson Muruli Mukasa (6 June 2016 - present)
 Henry Kajura ( - 6 June 2016)

References

Government ministries of Uganda
Public service ministries